is a passenger railway station located in the city of Ōzu, Ehime Prefecture, Japan. It is operated by JR Shikoku and has the station number "S12".

Lines
Only local trains stop at the station. Connections with other services are needed to travel further east of Matsuyama on the line.

Layout
The station consists of a side platform and an island platform serving three tracks with the centre one (track 2) being unused. The station building is unstaffed and serves only as a waiting room. Access to the island platform is by means of a level crossing with steps at both ends. A siding branches off track 1 and ends near the station building.

History
At that time it was the eastern terminus of the privately run 762 mm gauge Ehime Railways. When the company was nationalized on 1 October 1933, 
Japanese Government Railways (JGR) assumed control. The station was renamed Iyo-Nagahama and was operated as part of the Ehime Line. Iyo-Nagahama, which had also been moved 200m nearer to Kitanada at the same time, then became a through-station on the Yosan Mainline. With the privatization of JNR on 1 April 1987, the station came under the control of JR Shikoku.

Surrounding area
Ozu City Hall Nagahama Branch (former Nagahama Town Hall)
Nagahama port
Ehime Prefectural Nagahama High School

See also
 List of railway stations in Japan

References

External links
Station timetable

Railway stations in Ehime Prefecture
Railway stations in Japan opened in 1918
Ōzu, Ehime